Coomera Colts Soccer Club is a semi-professional soccer club based in Coomera, Queensland, Australia. The club play in the Football Queensland Premier League 2, the third flight of the Football Queensland administrative division and the fourth flight of the Australian soccer league system.

Founded in 1983, the club play their home games at Viney Park.

Current squad

First-team squad

Youth

Players from the U23s who have featured in a first-team matchday squad for Coomera in a competitive match

Honours

Football Queensland South Coast 
 FQPL 4 − South Coast / Men's Coast League 1 / First Division
 Premiership
 Winners (3): 1994, 1999, 2007
Championship
Winners (2): 1994, 2007

References

External links
Official website

Association football clubs established in 1983
1983 establishments in Australia
Soccer teams on the Gold Coast, Queensland